"Early Morning Rain," sometimes styled as "Early Mornin' Rain," is a song written, composed, and recorded by Canadian singer-songwriter Gordon Lightfoot. The song appears on his 1966 debut album Lightfoot! and, in a re-recorded version, on the 1975 compilation Gord's Gold.

Background
Lightfoot wrote and composed the song in 1964, but its genesis took root during his 1960 sojourn in Westlake, Los Angeles. Throughout this time, Lightfoot sometimes became homesick and would go out to the Los Angeles International Airport on rainy days to watch the approaching aircraft. The imagery of the flights taking off into the overcast sky was still with him when, in 1964, he was caring for his 5-month-old baby son and he thought, "I’ll put him over here in his crib, and I’ll write myself a tune." "Early Morning Rain" was the result.

The lyrics suggest someone down on his luck, standing at an airport fence and observing the thunderous takeoff of a Boeing 707 jet airliner. The general narrative of the song can be taken as a jet-age musical allegory to a hobo of yesteryear lurking around a railroad yard attempting to surreptitiously board and ride a freight train to get home.

Notable recordings and performances
The version by Ian & Sylvia reached #1 on the Canadian AC charts, August 2, 1965. Peter Paul and Mary's version of the song was recorded in 1965, reaching No. 39 in Canada, and No. 91 on the Billboard Hot 100. The next year, George Hamilton IV's version hit No. 9 on the US country chart In April 1971, Oliver's version hit No. 38 on the US adult contemporary chart. Paul Weller took the song to No. 40 in the United Kingdom in 2005. Bob Dylan included a version of the song on his 1970 album Self Portrait.

See also
List of train songs

References

1964 songs
Songs written by Gordon Lightfoot
Gordon Lightfoot songs
Peter, Paul and Mary songs
George Hamilton IV songs
Oliver (singer) songs